Shandiz (also Romanized as Shāndīz; formerly, Shāhī Deh) is a city and capital of Shandiz District, in Torqabeh and Shandiz County, Razavi Khorasan Province, Iran. At the 2006 census, its population was 6,402, in 1,706 families.

References 

Populated places in Torqabeh and Shandiz County
Cities in Razavi Khorasan Province